Star Wars: The Empire Strikes Back is the sequel to the vector graphics Star Wars arcade game. It was released by Atari Games in 1985 as a conversion kit for the original game. As in Star Wars, the player takes the role of Luke Skywalker in a set of battle sequences in a first-person perspective. The game features the Battle of Hoth and the subsequent escape of the Millennium Falcon through an asteroid field. The game is the third Star Wars arcade title from Atari; the raster game Return of the Jedi came out the previous year.

Home ports were released by Domark for the Amstrad CPC, BBC Micro, ZX Spectrum, Atari ST, Commodore 64, and Amiga.

Gameplay

During the Hoth sequences, the player is flying a Rebel snowspeeder. The first section has the player patrolling in a search and destroy mission for Probots (Imperial Probe Droids). Imperial transmissions emanating from the Probots can be shot to prolong the stage. Once the transmission does end up fully transmitted, the player advances. To earn a Jedi letter, the player must eradicate the specified number of probots.

The second snowspeeder sequence involves the assault of AT-AT and AT-ST walkers against the Rebel shield generator. The walkers have to be either destroyed or avoided, as collisions will damage the aircraft. The player has four tow-cables which can be used to take down the AT-AT walkers instantly if fired at the walker's legs. Otherwise, the player has to aim for the red cockpits in order to destroy the walkers. To earn a Jedi letter, the player must eradicate the specified number of walkers.

The second half of the game has the player take the role of Han Solo piloting at the head of a convoy trying to escape the Imperial onslaught. First, the player encounters a swath of TIE fighters. To earn a Jedi letter, the player must eradicate the specified number of TIE fighters. When enough time expires, the player moves on to an asteroid field, where the goal is simply to survive. To earn a Jedi letter, the player must make it through the field and not lose the game. Once finishing the fourth stage, the game starts back at the beginning of the Battle of Hoth on a higher difficulty level.

Vector objects are now much more noticeably detailed, and the asterisk-particle enemy shots resembling snowflakes from Star Wars are replaced with simpler and clearer vector star-shapes instead.

Reception
According to the creators, the game received less attention as it was not as fresh as the previous game. Additionally, it was sold as an upgrade kit, so arcade operators that had Star Wars running and getting steady incomes from it did not go for the upgrade.

Legacy
The game is included as an unlockable extra on Star Wars Rogue Squadron III: Rebel Strike for the GameCube.

See also
 The Empire Strikes Back, a different game for the Atari 2600 and Intellivision based on the movie

References

External links

The GameRoom Blog: Rare Game Room Gems — Empire Strikes Back 

Arcade video games
Amiga games
Amstrad CPC games
Atari ST games
Commodore 64 games
ZX Spectrum games
Empire Strikes Back (1985 video game)
Empire Strikes Back (1985 video game)
The Empire Strikes Back video games
Atari arcade games
Vector arcade video games
1985 video games
Rail shooters
Video games scored by David Whittaker
Video games developed in the United States
Domark games
Single-player video games